Saint Lucian Creole (Kwéyòl ), known locally as Patwa, is the French-based Creole widely spoken in Saint Lucia. It is the vernacular language of the country and is spoken alongside the official language of English.

Kwéyòl is a sub-variety of Antillean Creole, and like other varieties spoken in the Caribbean, it combines the syntax of African language origins and a vocabulary primarily derived from French. Like its similar Dominican counterpart, the English language has influenced the vocabulary of the creole. There has also been a recorded syntactical influence of the Carib language.

It remains in widespread use in Saint Lucia across the island. Though it is not an official language, the government and media houses present information in Kwéyòl, alongside English.

Origins 
Saint Lucia was first settled by Amerindian groups, more recently the Caribs, and subsequently colonised by the French and British, who changed hands of control of the island fourteen times. The British first attempted to colonise the island in 1605, but were killed or driven out by the Caribs inhabiting the island.

French groups gradually began to colonise the island so that by 1745, the French had regained control of the island and established functional administrative settlements. Like other forms of Antillean Creole, Saint Lucian Creole emerged from the development of a form of communication by African slaves on Caribbean plantations, made by combining French vocabulary with the syntax of the various native African languages of the slaves.
From French groups immigrating from Martinique, a form of Creole was imported and adopted by the black population living in small, remote mountain settlements as a vernacular.

Ownership of St. Lucia changed between the French and British between 1778 and 1802, until the British gained complete control of the island in 1803, and was formalised by the Treaty of Paris in 1814. St. Lucia became independent in 1979, with Sir John Compton serving as the first prime minister. English became the official language of the country, though Kwéyòl remained in widespread use throughout the island and was the sole language of the majority of the population. Kwéyòl monolingualism increasingly became less common over time, due to the precedence of English within the education system, which became more accessible to the general population through the mid-1960s.

History
It is a subvariety of Antillean Creole, which is spoken in other islands of the Lesser Antilles and is very closely related to the varieties spoken in Martinique, Dominica, Guadeloupe, Grenada and Trinidad and Tobago. The intelligibility rate with speakers of other varieties of Antillean Creole is almost 100%. Its syntactic, grammatical and lexical features are virtually identical to that of Martinican Creole, but like its Dominican counterpart, it includes more English loanwords than the Martinican variety.

Like the other Caribbean Creoles, Saint Lucian French Creole combines a syntax of African and Carib origin with a vocabulary derived primarily from French. In addition, many expressions reflect the presence of English influence. As the newer bilingual speakers of Kwéyòl and English grow up, the language has changed to reflect this bilingualism. It is not considered to be mutually intelligible with Standard French, but it is intelligible with the other French creoles of the Lesser Antilles. It is related to Haitian Creole, which has a number of distinctive features, but both are still mutually intelligible.

Kwéyòl is still widely spoken in Saint Lucia and movements from the 1980s onward have increased its use in media, education, and government. Although it has not been recognized as an official language alongside English more St. Lucians have come to view the language more positively and support its official implementation. In the mid-19th century Kwéyòl was exported to Panama, where it is known as San Miguel Creole French and is now moribund.

Orthography
The Kwéyol writing system contains 24 letters, representing 32 phonemes. This writing system used in St.Lucia and Dominica differs slightly from that used in Guadeloupe and Martinique. The letters Q and X are not used and the letter R only appears in English loan words. The letters C and U never appear alone and are always part of the digraphs Ch and Ou.

These are combinations of letters (digraphs) which represent one sound.
 ou represents the vowel .

Phonology

Consonants

Phonetic notes:
 This sound only occurs in a select few loan words from English ex. radyo  radio.
 In many varieties of Creole most notably rural dialects the voiced velar fricative  merges with the velar approximant . In this article we will use the written standard for Saint Lucian creole which does not indicate the distinction between the two phonemes.
 The voiced post-alveolar fricative  alternates in many words with the unvoiced glottal fricative : > to eat, > to bark > garden

Vowels

Antillean Creole
Dominican Creole French
Grenadian Creole French
Haitian Creole

Grammar

Personal Pronouns

Kwéyòl makes no distinction in case in its pronouns like in English so 'mwen' can mean I, me, or my.

The form 'an' is uncommon and only rarely heard although its use is quite widespread in the Creole spoken in Guadeloupe.

The pronouns above can be used as a sentence subject; mwen ka palé kwéyòl, object: nonm-lan bo'y or as possessives: papa yo malad.

The weak forms occur after vowels: palé ba'y! mwen wè'w.

Contractions with the pronoun mwen:

M’a - mwen pa

Ng’a - mwen ka

N’a - mwen ka

Ng’ay - mwen kay

N’ay - mwen kay

M’òkò - mwen pa ankò

Possessive Adjectives

In Creole possessive adjectives are placed after the noun. Ou 'your' and li 'his, her, its become w and y after a vowel.

Unlike in English or French, possessive adjectives can be used in addition to the indefinite and definite articles: jan mwen is 'my friend', an jan mwen is 'a friend of mine', and jan mwen-an is 'my friend'.

The use of the definite article evokes a different connotation. Whereas jan mwen would refer to my friend as opposed to someone else's, jan mwen-an would refer to a specific friend who had been previously mentioned at some point prior in the conversation.

Possessive Pronouns

Interrogatives

Ki is used as an interrogative adjective placed before a noun meaning 'what' or 'which': Ki chimiz ou simyé? Which shirt do you prefer?

Kilès is an interrogative pronoun. Kilès ou simyé? Which one do you prefer?

Kilès used as a subject directly before a verb is followed by the relative pronoun ki: Kilès ki pli gwo? Which is bigger?

When ki moun is used as a subject and comes directly before the verb it is followed by the relative pronoun ki: Ki moun ki di'w sa? Who told you that?

but Ki moun ou yé? Who are you?

Ki moun used to mean 'whose' (belonging to whom) directly follows the noun in question: Had ki moun ou ka lavé? 'Whose clothes are you washing?'

Nouns

Nouns in Kwéyòl are invariable, they do not inflect for case or number. There is no grammatical gender, unlike French.

Articles

The indefinite article is an, on, yan or yon

An mabwiya A house lizard On bétjin A barracuda Yan zé An egg Yon fèy A leaf

The definite article may take the form -a, -la, -an, or -lan depending on the sounds of the final syllable of the noun it qualifies. It comes after the noun.latè a               the earth

tab la               the table

mouton an      the sheep

nonm lan        the man

Verbs

Verbs in Creole are invariable and are not conjugated. Instead tense and mood are expressed using various particles placed before the verb.

 ø  the absence of a particle indicates the simple past: pwèt-la bwè kafé the priest drank coffee

It also indicates the present perfect, this difference inferred through context: pwèt-la bwè kafé the priest has drunk coffee

There is a group of verbs, mostly modals and verbs of emotion which do not follow this rule and instead express the present tense when used on their own. These verbs are:

ni 'to have' sa 'to be able to' pé 'to be able to' vlé 'to want' konnèt 'to know' sav 'to know' enmen 'to love' kontan 'to like' hayi 'to hate' simyé 'to prefer' kwè 'to believe' dwé 'to owe' wigwété 'to regret'

Mak ni an pil lahan 'Mark has a lot of money' Kilès kay ou simyé? Which house do you prefer? Ou vlé witounen denmen 'You want to return tomorrow'

 ka This particle expresses the simple present, present continuous as well as habitual present

Tibway-la ka wè kabwit-la The by sees the goat

Fanm-lan ka déjnen The woman is having breakfast

Lapli ka tonbé an chay an livènaj It rains a lot during the rainy season

Serial Verbs

A feature which Saint Lucian French Creole shares with other West Atlantic Creole languages is the ability to string verbs together.

A main verb may be combined with a select group of verbs of motion (namely alé 'to go' vini 'to come' kouwi 'to run' pòté 'to carry' mennen 'to lead' voyé 'to send')

I kouwi alé lékòl He went to school running.

Irregular verbs

There are only three irregular verbs in Creole alé (to go), gadé (to look, watch) and the copula sé.

 Alé has a second form ay. There is no change in meaning and the two forms are interchangeable.

Alé also forms a contraction with the verb particle ka; ka alé kalé ka ay kay.

 Gadé has two forms in the imperative: ga and gadé although gad may sometimes be heard as well.
 Sé is irregular in that it does not take verb particles. Instead the verb particles itself are used in place of a verb only in the present tense is it present. The present tense has two forms, one used before a noun (sé) and the other used when it is placed at the end of a sentence (yé)

In the present sé is not used to link a noun and a predicative adjective. It is used before a noun.

Nonm-lan ho.  The man is tall. (Lit. The man tall)

but: I sé an nonm ho. He is a tall man.

The past tense also has two forms either the past tense particle té or the form sété with these forms being interchangeable.

The future and conditional forms ké and té ké are not used in Saint Lucia but can be heard on other islands where Creole is spoken.

Prepositions

 a - at, on, to (limited use)
 abò - on board, on, in

òbò (Guadeloupe)

Yo mouté abò minibous-la. They got into the bus.

 adan - 1) inside, in 2) out of, out from

1) I mété kwéyon-an adan pòch li. He put the pencil in his pocket. 2) I sòti mouchwè adan pòch li. He took the kerchief out of his pocket.

 akòdans - according to, in accordance with

Yo pa ka viv akòdans pawòl Bondyé. They are not living according to God's word.

 alapòté - alongside, beside, next to

Kon kannòt-la wivé alapòté tjé-a, péchè-a mawé kòd-la vitman. When the boat arrived alongside the dock the fisherman tied the rope quickly.

 alimans, aliman - side by side

Yo té asiz alimans yonn a lòt. They sat side by side.

 an, nan - in, upon

Sé timanmay-la ka jwé an savann-an. The children are playing in the field.

 anba - below, under

Tifi-a séwé pòpòt li anba kouch-la. The girl hid her doll under the bed.

 andidan - 1) inside 2) out of, out from

1) Jibyé-a andidan kalòj-la. The bird is inside the cage. 2)Kwab-la sòti andidan twou-a. The crab exited the hole.

 andji - instead of, rather than

Andji ou édé mwen ou ka wi mwen! Instead of helping me you are laughing at me!

 anho - above, over

Lanp-lan ka pann anho tab-la. The lamp is hanging above the table.

 anlè - 1) on top of 2) off of, off from

1) Liv-la anlè tab-la. The book is on top of the table. 2) Yo tiyé'y anlè tab-la. They took it off the table.

 anmitan, nanmitan - in the middle of

Nou wè'y anmitan lawi-a. We saw him in the middle of the street.

 anpami - among

I té ka séwé anpami sé moun-nan. He was hiding among those people.

 ant - between

Motoka-a ant légliz-la èk lékòl-la. The car is between the church and the school.

 antiwan, antiwans - except

Ou pé pwan tout sé liv-la antiwan sé sala. You can take all the books except those ones.

 apwé - after

Yo antwé yonn apwé lòt. They entered one after the other.

 asou - 1) on top of 2) off of, off from 3) toward 4) about, concerning

1) Bonm-lan asou mach-la. The bucket is on the step.2) Gwanmanman mwen tiwé chòdyè-a asou difé-a. My grandmother took the cooking pot off the fire.

3) Polis-la maché asou nonm-lan. The police officer walked towards the man. 4) Mwen pa lontan palé asou politik. I don't like talking about politics.

asi (Guadeloupe) sou (Haiti)

 ba, ban, bay - for

Fè sa ba li. Do that for him. Fanm-lan achté an bonbon ban mwen. The woman bought me a cake. Nou kay fè'y bay zòt. We'll do it for you.

 bò - alongside, beside, next to

Wétjen-an vini bò tjé-a. The shark came near to the dock.

 bòdaj - alongside, beside, next to

Sé chouval-la té ka pozé bòdaj chimen-an. The horses were resting next to the road.

 dapwé - according to (ones own understanding)

Dapwé'w mwen té ka pasé an ti chimen. You thought I was walking on the small path.

 dépi - from, since

1) Dépi ansyen dat nonm ka jwé gwenndé. People have played dice since ancient times.  2) I té ni gwo dlo dépi Bèson pou wivé Kastwi. There was flooding from Bexon to Castries.

 dèwò, dòwò - outside

Chyen-an dèwò kay-la. The dog is outside the house.

 dèyè - 1) behind 2) after ( in pursuit of)

1) Machann-nan dèyè yan pyébwa. The vendor is behind the tree. 2) Sé chyen-an ka kouwi dèyè chat-la. The dogs are running after the cat.

 di - of (limited use)

I alé Langlitè a laj di ventan. He went to England at the age of twenty. Sé gwanmoun-nan ka palé di politik. The elders are talking about politics.

 douvan - in front of, before

Ou pé mouté montany-lan ki doubout douvan'w-la. You can climb the mountain that stands before you.

 èksèpté, asèpté - except

Sé polis-la awèsté toutmoun ki té adan kay wonm-lan èksèpté nonm sala. The police arrested everyone who was in the rum shop except that man.

 é, èk, èvè, èvèk, èp, épi - with

Mak té alé an vil épi manman´y. Mark went to town with his mother. Nou kontan twavay èvèw. We like to work with you.

 hòd - from, away from

1) Fanm-lan ka wété dis kilomèt hòd twavay li-a. The woman lives ten kilometres from work. 2) Tounen hòd péché zòt! Turn away from your sins!

 jis, jik - until, as far as, up to

Jis ki koté ou ka wivé Up to which point are you going (Where are you going)

 konsèné - about, concerning

Mwen té kay vlé palé ba'w konsèné ich ou. I would like to speak to you about your child.

 kont - 1) against 2) about, because of

1) Nou kont lwa nèf-la. We are against the new law. 2) Mwen faché kont bonm-lan ki tonbé-a. I am angry about the bucket that fell.

 lanmen, lenmen - from

Yo achté tout ba'ay lanmen'y. They bought everything from him.

 ofon - at the bottom of

Chatou ka viv ofon lanmè-a. Octopuses live at the bottom of the sea.

 olyè - instead of

Chwézi wòb sala olyè sala. Choose this dress instead of that one.

 owon, oliwon - around

Nou maché tout owon vilaj-la ka chaché timanmay sala. We walked all around the village looking for that child.

alantou (Guadeloupe) otou (Haiti)

 pa - by, through

1) Bondyé sové nou pa lagwas li. God saved us through his grace. 2) Yo ka vann zowanj dé dòla pa liv. They sell oranges for two dollars a pound.

 pou - for, in order to, ni pou - must

1)Tantant mwen wété la pou dé nanné. My aunt lived there for two years. 2) Machann-nan vann dé bwapen ba li pou sis dòla. The vendor sold him two breadfruits for six dollars.

3) Nou wimèsyé'y pou vizité nou. We thanked him for visiting us. 4) I vini pou étidyé. He came to study. 5) Sé pou nou alé an hòtè chaché manjé. We have to go to the country to look for food.

6) Ou ni pou éséyé. You have to try.

 pwé, opwé - near

Légliz-la pwé lapòs-la. The church is near the post office.

 san - without

I kouwi jik bòdlanmè-a san soulyé. He ran all the way to the sea side without shoes.

 silon - according to

Silon jij-la nonm-lan té koupab. According to the judge the man was guilty.

 vizavi - in line with, with respect to

I ka maché vizavi wout-la. He is walking in line with the road.

Vocabulary
The Vocabulary of SLC is mostly derived from French with important contributions from English and West African languages.

English Derived Vocabulary

Creole is a language historically and primarily spoken in rural areas. As such it has a large assortment of words related to nature, agriculture and fishing

Zannimo - Animals

Jibyé - Birds

Pwéson - Fish

Mamifè - Mammals

Bèt - Bugs

Wèptil épi anfibyen - Reptiles and amphibians

Place names

Sent Lisi - Saint Lucia

References

External links

 http://www.saintluciancreole.dbfrank.net/dictionary.htm St. Lucian Creole Bible
 http://www.potomitan.info/dictionnaire/index.php Creole - French Dictionary
 http://www.creolica.net/Le-vocabulaire-creole-utilise-dans
 http://www.potomitan.info/divers/arbres.html Tree Names in Latin French and Martinique Creole
 http://creoles.free.fr/Cours/proverb.htm Creole Proverbs
 http://onechapteraday.fr/des-proverbes-creoles/ Creole Proverbs
 http://pedagogie.ac-guadeloupe.fr/langues_vivantes_regionales_lvr Learning Material in Guadeloupe Creole
 https://www.ac-guadeloupe.fr/circonscriptions/bouillante/index5a.htm Kreyol an Mouvman
 Lexilogos Kreyol Antillais

French-based pidgins and creoles
Creoles of the Caribbean
Languages of Saint Lucia
French language in the Americas